Cape Palos is a cape in the Spanish municipality of Cartagena, in the region of Murcia.  It is part of a small range of volcanic mounts that form a small peninsula.  The Mediterranean islands of Grosa and the group known as the Hormigas Islands are part of this range, as well as the islands in the Mar Menor (“Little Sea”).  The name  is derived from the Latin word , meaning ‘lagoon’, a reference to the Mar Menor.

According to Pliny the Elder and Rufus Festus Avienus, there was once a temple dedicated to Baal Hammon on the promontory of the cape, which later became associated with the cult of Saturn.  During the reign of Philip II of Spain, a watchtower was built on the promontory as a defense measure against the Barbary Pirates. Some battles occurred in the place include the Battle of Cape Palos (1591) during the Anglo-Spanish War (1585–1604), Battle of Cape Palos (1758) during the Spanish-Barbary conflict (1694–1792), Battle of Cape Palos (1815) during the Second Barbary War and Battle of Cape Palos (1938) during the Spanish Civil War.

 began operating on January 31, 1865.  The cape is part of a marine reserve, the Reserva Marina de Cabo de Palos e Islas Hormigas.

External links
  Guía Turística de Cabo de Palos
  Los cartagineses en Turdetania y Oretania
  Toponimia romana y de romanización en Murcia

Cartagena, Spain
Palos
Populated places in the Region of Murcia